Tom Mallin (14 June 1927 – 21 December 1977) was a British writer of novels and plays, and also an artist. Beginning his working life in the art world, as a picture restorer as well as a practising painter, illustrator and sculptor, Mallin at the age of 43, became a full-time writer, with five novels published and several plays produced on stage and for BBC Radio before his death from cancer at the age of 50.

Biography

Early years, family and education
Tom Mather Mallin was born at West Bromwich, Staffordshire, England, to Clifford Vincent Mallin (1887–1932) and his wife Olive May née Mather (1895–1978).

From 1943 to 1945 Mallin studied at Birmingham School of Art, going on to win a scholarship to the Royal Academy Schools. However, but after doing National Service he decided to study at the international Anglo-French Art Centre in London, where he met his future wife Muriel Grace George (1925–2002). He earned a living by finding employment as a Bond Street picture restorer, mainly of 17th- and 18th-century paintings, while also creating his own paintings, drawings, illustrations, prints and sculptures. Mallin and Muriel George married in 1949, moved to Clare, Suffolk, in 1955, and had two sons, Simon and Rupert.

Writing
Mallin had his first play, Curtains, produced in 1968, and went on to write many more, for both stage and radio, having a six plays broadcast on BBC Radio before his death in 1977 and others posthumously.

Turning to full-time writing in 1970, at the age of 43, he also had five novels published by Allison and Busby, the book covers featuring his own artwork. 

In a 1971 article in The Guardian, Michael McNay described Mallin's first novel, Dodecahedron (1970), as "shocking", and said: "Tom Mallin's prose bleeds. His plays and novels are the flayed flesh of English language. If there had to be a visual comparison (and why not? Mallin used to be a realist painter) it would be with a crucifixion by Grunewald or a film by Bunuel." The novel was also published in the US, by Outerbridge and Lazard in 1972, to mixed reviews, with Kirkus Reviews noting that Dodecahedron owes a great deal to the playwriting genre.

Mallin's last novel, Bedrok, published in 1978, was described by Hermione Lee in The Observer as "a stylish as well as a very troubling novel". Two of Mallin's novels have been reprinted: Knut ("a darkly comic take on the gothic novel") and Erowina ("A dark, ambitious, stimulating, and challenging novel ... Tom Mallin's masterpiece, and a work that remains surprising, fresh and vital").

Awards and recognition
In 1979, alongside John Arden, Richard Harris, Don Haworth, Jill Hyem, Jennifer Phillips and Fay Weldon, Mallin won a Giles Cooper Award, with his posthumous winning work being included in Best Radio Plays of 1978.

Mallin was included in The Imagination on Trial: British and American writers discuss their working methods (Allison & Busby, 1982), co-edited by Alan Burns and Charles Sugnet, which contained interviews with 10 other authors as well as Burns himself: J. G. Ballard, Eva Figes, John Gardner, Wilson Harris, John Hawkes, B. S. Johnson, Michael Moorcock, Grace Paley, Ishmael Reed, and Alan Sillitoe.

Bibliography

Novels
 Dodecahedron, Allison & Busby, 1970, .
 Knut, Allison & Busby, 1971, ; new edition, with an introduction by Rupert Mallin, Verbivoracious Press, 2014, .
 Erowina, Allison & Busby, 1972, ; new edition, illus., Verbivoracious Press, 2015, .
 Lobe, Allison & Busby, 1977, .
 Bedrok, Allison & Busby, 1978, .

Selected plays
 Curtains, 1968 – Edinburgh Festival's Traverse Theatre, directed by Michael Rudman; Canonbury Theatre, London, 1970; produced for radio by Guy Vaeson; published by Calder & Boyars, Playscript 57, 1971, 
 As Is Proper, 1971, King's Head Theatre, London
 Cot, 1971, Edinburgh Fringe Festival
 Downpour – broadcast 1971
 The Novelist, 1971, Traverse Theatre, Edinburgh; Hampstead Theatre Club
 Mrs Argent, 1972, Soho Poly, London; BBC Radio 3, 1980
 Rooms – broadcast 1973
 Birds of Prey – (not produced), 1973
 Two Gentlemen of Hadleigh Heath – broadcast 1973
 The Lodger – broadcast 1974
 Vicar Martin – broadcast 1974 (BBC Radio 3, 1976)
 Whispers (not produced), 1974
 Rowland, BBC Radio 4: The Monday Play, 4 July 1977, and BBC Radio 4: Afternoon Theatre, 27 August 1978
 Spanish Fly – broadcast BBC Radio 3, 18 September 1977
 Halt! Who Goes There?, 1977, broadcast posthumously, with Clive Swift, Rosemary Leach, 26 March 1978; winner of a 1978 Giles Cooper Award and published in Best Radio Plays of 1978 by Methuen, 1979

References

External links
 Tom Mallin at doolleecom
 Rupert Mallin, "Tom Mallin 1927 – 1977"
 "Tom Mallin – stories from a biography", Rupert Mallin's Podcast.

1927 births
1977 deaths
20th-century British artists
20th-century British dramatists and playwrights
20th-century British military personnel
20th-century British novelists
Alumni of the Birmingham School of Art